Ptychadena boettgeri is a species of frog in the family Ptychadenidae. It is only known from its type locality near Quilimane, Mozambique.

References

Ptychadena
Frogs of Africa
Amphibians of Mozambique
Endemic fauna of Mozambique
Amphibians described in 1893
Taxa named by Georg Johann Pfeffer